Diana Valerie Cabrera (born 18 March 1984 in Toronto, Ontario) is a Uruguayan-Canadian sports shooter.

She initially took up the sport for her father, who feared having to give up his extensive firearms collection due to an illness. He asked her to acquire a possession and acquisition licence (PAL) so she could keep his collection. Cabrera's talent was recognized at the club and she began to shoot competitively.

In 2006, while a student at Centennial College, Cabrera represented Canada for the 2006 Commonwealth Games in the discipline 50-metre rifle. However, she began competing for Uruguay, her parents' home country, which would pay her travel expenses to international events.  She continued to live and work in Canada, where she was the office manager for the Canadian Shooting Sports Association (CSSA) at their headquarters in Toronto from 2008 to 2013.

In 2007 she represented the Uruguay national team in the 2007 Pan American Games in Rio de Janeiro. In 2010, Cabrera competed in the 2010 South American Games in Medellin and won the bronze medal in 50-metre rifle, prone, with a score of 573 points. This was the first medal win for Uruguay in this event.  In 2012 Cabrera competed at the XIX Campeonato Sudamericano de Tiro Deportivo held in Buenos Aires where she won the silver medal at the 50m-prone event and finished in third place overall, making a comeback in her standings. In 2014 Cabrera competed in both the World Championships and the American Championships. The following year she participated with the Uruguayan team at the 2015 Pan American Games in her home town of Toronto, where she finished in 21st place in both the 10-metre air rifle and the 50-metre rifle events.

References

1984 births
Living people
Sportspeople from Toronto
Uruguayan female sport shooters
Canadian female sport shooters
Centennial College alumni
South American Games bronze medalists for Uruguay
South American Games medalists in shooting
Competitors at the 2010 South American Games
Shooters at the 2015 Pan American Games
Canadian people of Uruguayan descent